The Etrich VII monoplane was designed by Igo Etrich and first flown in 1911. Some were sold to European militaries, including Russia, Germany and Austria-Hungary.

Specifications

Operators
 
Austro-Hungarian Imperial and Royal Aviation Troops
 
 Imperial Russian Air Service
  German Empire
Imperial German Flying Corps

References

Monoplanes
Aircraft first flown in 1911